Cantera is an open-source chemical kinetics software used for solving chemically reacting laminar flows. It has been used as a third-party library in external reacting flow simulation codes, such as FUEGO and CADS, using Fortran, C++, etc. to evaluate properties and chemical source terms that appear in the application's governing equations. Cantera was originally written and developed by Prof. Dave Goodwin of California Institute of Technology. It is written in C++ and can be used from C++, Python, Matlab and Fortran.

See also 
 Chemical kinetics
 Autochem
 CHEMKIN
 Chemical WorkBench
 Kinetic PreProcessor (KPP)

References

External links 
Cantera Github repository
Online documentation for Cantera 2.4
Presentation on Cantera features at 2006 NSF workshop
Download link

Computational chemistry software
Combustion